"Dangerous" is a song recorded by American country music singer Morgan Wallen. It was from his second studio album Dangerous: The Double Album. The song was co-wrote by Wallen and Ernest K. Smith, and produced by Joey Moi.

Background
“Dangerous” was inspired by a night he had spent in downtown Nashville, which ended with Wallen being arrested for public intoxication and disorderly conduct outside of Kid Rock's honky-tonk. He said: “I don't wanna go downtown, doing what we used to,” he sings on the track. “Twist the top off another round, hell, I got enough loose screws…Think I'm gonna stay right here tonight/ Cause that could be dangerous.” So he wanted to write “a warning” to himself.

Charts

Weekly charts

Year-end charts

Certifications

References

2021 songs
Morgan Wallen songs
Songs written by Morgan Wallen
Song recordings produced by Joey Moi
Songs written by Ernest (musician)